Cyril Maidment (1929-2004) was an international speedway rider from England.

Speedway career 
Maidment reached the final of the Speedway World Championship on two occasions in the 1961 Individual Speedway World Championship and the 1964 Individual Speedway World Championship.

He rode in the top tier of British Speedway from 1951 to 1968, riding for various clubs, winning the National League on eight occasions.

World final appearances

Individual World Championship
 1961 –  Malmö, Malmö Stadion - 12th - 4pts
 1964 –  Gothenburg, Ullevi – 7th – 8pts

World Team Cup
 1962 -  Slaný (with Barry Briggs / Ronnie Moore / Peter Craven / Ron How) - 2nd - 24pts (0)

References 

1929 births
2004 deaths
British speedway riders
Belle Vue Aces riders
St Austell Gulls riders
Wimbledon Dons riders
Wolverhampton Wolves riders